GWY may refer to:
 Galway Airport, in Ireland
 Glen Waverley railway station, in Melbourne, Australia
 River Wye
 USA3000 Airlines, a defunct American passenger airline

See also 
 Cherokee language, in Cherokee syllabics: